Stahl (German: steel) is a surname of German origin, which also occurs among Jews and Hutterites.
It may refer to:

 Agustín Stahl (1842–1917), Puerto Rican physician, ethnologist, and botanist
 Alexander von Stahl (born 1938), German lawyer, politician, and civil servant 
 Armin Mueller-Stahl (born 1930), German actor, painter, writer, and musician
 Arthur Goldstein (1887-1943), German socialist and communist politician, whose pseudonym is "Stahl"
 Ben Stahl (activist) (1915–1998), American political activist
 Ben Stahl (1910–1987), American artist, illustrator, and author
 Chick Stahl (1873–1907), American baseball outfielder
 Christian Ernst Stahl (1848–1919), German botanist
 Daniel Stahl (born 1971), American game designer
 Daniel Ståhl (born 1992), Swedish discus thrower
 Floyd Stahl (1899–1996), American collegiate athletics coach
 Franklin Stahl (born 1929), American molecular biologist and geneticist
 Franz Stahl (born 1962), American guitarist
 Fredrika Stahl (born 1984), Swedish singer and songwriter
 Frieda Stahl (1922–2021), American physicist
 Friedrich Julius Stahl (1802–1861), German constitutional lawyer, political philosopher and politician 
 Georg Ernst Stahl (1660–1734), German chemist
 Gerry Stahl (born 1945), American computer scientist, son of Ben Stahl
 Heinrich Stahl (1600–1657), Baltic-German pastor
 Henri Joseph Stahl (1877–1942), Romanian stenographer, graphologist, historian, and fiction writer
 Henri H. Stahl (1901–1991), Romanian Marxist cultural anthropologist and social historian
 Henriette Yvonne Stahl (1900–1984), Romanian novelist and short story writer
 Jake Stahl (1879–1922), American baseball player and manager
 Jean-Baptist Stahl (1869–1932), porcelain artist, creator, and designer of Phanolith
 Jerry Stahl (born 1953), American novelist and screenwriter
 John Stahl (1953–2022), Scottish actor
 John M. Stahl (1896–1950), American film director and producer
 Lesley Stahl (born 1941), American television journalist 
 Linda Stahl (born 1985), German javelin thrower
 Lisa Stahl (born 1965), American model, actress, and game show host
 Lydia Stahl (1885–?), Soviet spy
 Nick Stahl, (born 1979), American actor
 Norman H. Stahl (born 1931), judge of the United States Court of Appeals
 Pete Stahl, American vocalist
 Richard Stahl (1932–2006), American actor
 Rose Stahl (1868–1955), American actress
 Samuel M. Stahl (born 1939), American Rabbi and writer
 Sebastian Stahl (born 1978), German racing driver 
 Stephanie Stahl (reporter), medical reporter for KYW-TV
 Stephen Stahl (born 1951), American physician and psychopharmacologist

Other uses
 Stahl, Missouri, a community in the United States
 Stahl, the green cavalier and playable character in Fire Emblem Awakening

See also 

 Staal, Dutch surname, cognate to German Stahl 
 Michael Stal (born 1963), German computer scientist
Jewish surnames
German-language surnames
Occupational surnames